MVZ may refer to:

 Mil Moscow Helicopter Plant, Russia
 Museum of Vertebrate Zoology, Berkeley, California, USA